Maas is a Dutch and North German patronymic surname, from an archaic short form of Thomas. It could also be a toponymic surname derived from the river Maas. The surname is quite common in the Netherlands, ranking 43rd in 2007 (16,070 people).

People with the surname Maas include:
Abe Maas (1855–1941), German-born American founder of the Maas Brothers stores
Adriana Maas (1702–1746), Dutch stage actress
Allan Maas (1922–2014), Australian rules footballer 
Annelies Maas (born 1960), Dutch swimmer
Anthony Maas (1859–1927), German-born American exegete
Benjamin Maas (born 1989), German footballer
Bill Maas (born 1962), American football player
Bob Maas (1907–1996), Dutch Olympic sailor
Cees Maas (born 1947), Dutch businessman, CFO of the ING Group
Cheryl Maas (born 1984), Dutch snowboarder
Chris Maas (born 1957), American canoe sailor and builder
Cornald Maas (born 1962), Dutch television presenter
David E. Maas (born 1940), American historian
Dick Maas (born 1951), Dutch film maker
Dirk Maas (1659–1717), Dutch landscape painter
Duke Maas (1929–1976), American baseball player
Erich Maas (born 1940), German footballer
Ernest Maas (1892–1986), American screenwriter
Frans Maas (born 1964), Dutch long jumper
Fred Maas (born 1957), American businessman
Frederica Sagor Maas (1900–2012), American playwright, author and supercentenarian
 (born 1960), German screenwriter and movie director
Greg Maas (born 1966), American soccer goalkeeper
Günther Maas (born 1941), German wrestler
Heiko Maas (born 1966), German politician
Henry Maas (born 1949?), Australian artist, Melbourne cafe and club proprietor, cabaret performer (The Busby Berkleys, Buddy Lovestein) & lead singer of the Bachelors from Prague 
Hermann Maas (1877–1970), German pastor and opponent of Nazism
Hiltje Maas-van de Kamer (born 1941), Dutch botanist
Isabella Offenbach Maas (1817–1891), German-American opera singer
James Maas (born 1938), American social psychologist known for his sleep research
Jan Maas (cyclist, born 1900) (1900–1977), Dutch racing cyclist
Jan Maas (1911–1962), Dutch Olympic sailor
Jane Maas (1932–2018), American advertising executive and author
Jason Maas (born 1975), Canadian football quarterback
Jelle Maas (born 1991), Dutch badminton player
Jeremy Maas (1928–1997), British art dealer and art historian
Jo Maas (born 1954), Dutch road cyclist
 (1861–1941), Dutch sculptor
Joseph Maas (1847–1886), English tenor
Kevin Maas (born 1965), American baseball player
Melvin Maas (1898–1964), American Marine aviator and politician from Minnesota
Mike Maas (1979-) Professional Walleye Angler from Wisconsin, USA
 (b. 1991), Dutch fashion model
Nell Ginjaar-Maas (1931–2012), Dutch politician
Nellie Maas (born 1935), Dutch figure skater
Nicolaes Maes (1634–1693), Dutch genre and portrait painter
Paul Maas (1880–1964), German philologist known for Maas's law
Paul Maas (born 1939), Dutch botanist and a specialist in the flora of the neotropics
Peter Maas (1929–2001), American journalist and author
Rob Maas (born 1969), Dutch footballer
Rudolph Arnold Maas Geesteranus (1911–2003), Dutch mycologist
Rupert Maas (born 1960), English painting specialist and gallery owner
Sarah J. Maas (born 1986), American fantasy author
Sharon Maas (born 1951), Guyanese novelist
Sivan Malkin Maas (born 1970s), Israeli humanistic rabbi
Timo Maas (born 1969), German DJ
Tjaarke Maas (1974–2004), Dutch painter
Willard Maas (1906–1971), American experimental filmmaker and poet
Winy Maas (born 1958), Dutch architect
 (born 1950), German diplomat

See also
 Maas (disambiguation)
 Maes (surname), variant spelling of the surname
 Maass, a German surname
 Mace (surname)

References

Dutch-language surnames
Low German surnames
Patronymic surnames